La Conquista is a municipality in the Carazo department of Nicaragua.

Municipalities of the Carazo Department